Monteriggioni is a comune in the province of Siena in the Italian region of Tuscany. It borders on the communes of Casole d'Elsa, Castellina in Chianti, Castelnuovo Berardenga, Colle di Val d'Elsa, Poggibonsi, Siena, and Sovicille.  The town is architecturally and culturally significant; it hosts several piazzas, and is referenced in Dante Alighieri's Divine Comedy.

History

Monteriggioni is a medieval walled town, located on a natural hillock, built by the Sienese in 1214–19 as a front line in their wars against Florence, by assuming command of the Via Cassia running through the Val d'Elsa and Val Staggia to the west.

During the conflicts between Siena and Florence in the Middle Ages, the city was strategically placed as a defensive fortification. It also withstood many attacks from both the Florentines and the forces of the Bishop of Volterra. In 1554 the Sienese were able to place control of the town's garrison to Giovannino Zeti, who had been exiled from Florence. In 1554, in an act of reconciliation with the Medicis, Zeti simply handed the keys of the town over to the Medicean forces— considered a "great betrayal" by the town's people.

Main sights
There are 14 towers on square bases set at equidistance, and two portals or gates. One gate, the Porta Fiorentina opens toward Florence to the north, and the other, the Porta Romana, faces Rome to the south. The main street within the walls connects the two gates in a roughly straight line.

The main town square, the Piazza Roma, is dominated by a Romanesque church with a simple, plain façade. Other houses, some in the Renaissance style (once owned by local nobles, gentry, and wealthy merchants) face into the piazza. Off the main piazza smaller streets give way to public gardens fronted by the other houses and small businesses of the town. In more hostile times, these gardens provided vital sustenance when enemies gathered around the walls during sieges.

Other sights in the town's countryside include:
Badia of Santi Salvatore e Cirino in Abbadia a Isola, a Romanesque abbey from the mid-12th century
Romanesque church of San Lorenzo in Colle Ciupi
Romanesque Pieve of Santa Maria a Castello, known since as early as 971
Romanesque-Gothic hermitage of San Leonardo al Lago
Villa Santa Colomba

Cultural significance
The Tuscan poet Dante Alighieri used the turrets of Monteriggioni to evoke the sight of the ring of giants encircling the Infernal abyss. 

Monteriggioni also plays a significant role in the games Assassin's Creed II and Assassin's Creed: Brotherhood, both of which are loosely based around certain key historical events in Renaissance Italy. It is home to protagonist Ezio Auditore and his uncle Mario, who live in the fictional Villa Auditore, which is based on Villa di Maiano.

Education 
Public schools include:
 Preschools (Scuole dell'Infanzia): C. Collodi, Don Muzzi, and Pinocchio
 Elementary schools (Scuole primare): I. Calvino, G. Rodari, and Don L. Milani
 One junior high school (Scuola secondaria di 1° grado): Scuola Media Statale "Dante Alighieri"

All public schools within the commune are a part of the Istituto Comprensivo Statale di Monteriggioni, School District #38.

International School of Siena, a private international school, is in the commune.

Demographic evolution

Municipal government

The  is chaired by the mayor, who appoints others members, called .

Since 1995, the mayor of Monteriggioni is directly elected by citizens, originally every four, then every five years. The current mayor is Andrea Frosini (PD), elected on 26 May 2019 with 43.3% of the votes.

Notes

Gallery

References

External links

Official site

Hilltowns in Tuscany